Hoseyn Aliabad (also Romanized as Ḩoseyn ‘Alīābād; also known as Ḩoseynkhān) is a village in Kakavand-e Sharqi Rural District, Kakavand District, Delfan County, Lorestan Province, Iran. At the 2006 census, its population was 25, in 6 families.

References 

Towns and villages in Delfan County